The Unlucky Mummy is an Ancient Egyptian artifact in the collection of the British Museum in London. The identity of the original owner is unknown. This "Painted wooden mummy-board of an unidentified woman" was acquired by the British Museum in 1889.

Overview
The name 'Unlucky Mummy' is misleading as the artifact is not a mummy at all, but rather a gessoed and painted wooden 'mummy-board' or inner coffin lid. It was found at Thebes and can be dated by its shape and the style of its decoration to the late 21st or early 22nd Dynasty (c 950–900 BC). In the British Museum it is known by its serial number EA 22542.

The beardless face and the position of the hands with fingers extended show that it was made to cover the mummified body of a woman. Her identity is not known due to the brief hieroglyphic inscriptions containing only short religious phrases, and omitting mention of the name of the deceased. The high quality of the lid indicates that the owner was a person of high rank. It was usual for such ladies to participate in the musical accompaniments to the rituals in the temple of Amen-ra; hence early British Museum publications described the owner of 22542 as a 'priestess of Amen-Ra'. E.A. Wallis Budge, Keeper of Egyptian and Assyrian Antiquities from 1894 to 1924, also suggested that she might have been of royal blood, but this was pure speculation and is not supported by the iconography of the lid.

Physical attributes
The detail is painted upon the plaster, and hands protrude from the wooden mummy-board. For its age, the mummy-board is of good quality.

Exhibition history
The mummy-board was donated to the British Museum in July 1889 by Mrs Warwick Hunt of Holland Park, London, on behalf of Mr Arthur F Wheeler. It was displayed in the 'First Egyptian Room' of the Museum from the 1890s and has remained on public view ever since, with the exception of periods during the First and Second World Wars, when it was removed from its case for safety. It has left the Museum on a number of occasions, in 1990, when it formed part of a temporary exhibition held at two venues in Australia and between 4 February to 27 May 2007 along with 271 pieces the 'Unlucky Mummy' was exhibited at Taiwan's National Palace Museum during a press conference. The mummy to which the article belonged is said to have been left in Egypt since it never formed part of the collections of the British Museum. The mummy board is currently displayed in Room 62.

The 'Unlucky Mummy' in folklore

The mummy-board has acquired a reputation for bringing misfortune, and a vast web of mythology has developed around it. It has been credited with causing death, injury and large-scale disasters such as the sinking of the RMS Titanic in 1912, thereby earning the nickname 'The Unlucky Mummy'. None of these stories have any basis in fact, of course, but from time to time the strength of the rumours has led to a flood of enquiries on the subject. A disclaimer written by Wallis Budge was published in 1934, and yet since that time the myth has undergone further embellishment.

The 'Unlucky Mummy' has also been linked to the death of the British writer and journalist, Bertram Fletcher Robinson. Robinson conducted research into the history of that artefact whilst working as a journalist for the Daily Express newspaper during 1904.  He became convinced that the 'Unlucky Mummy' had malevolent powers and died just three years later aged 36 years.

References

External links
 British Museum page

Ancient Egyptian objects in the British Museum